The MX-8 Armored Escort Vehicle was an experimental armored vehicle developed by Philippine steelworks fabricator Steelcraft Industrial & Development Corporation, in collaboration with the Philippine Army, arising from a need by the latter for smaller, tougher armored vehicle that can fill an escort role larger armored vehicles cannot; a consideration confined Philippine jungles aggravated. MX-8 stands for "Military Experimental 8", following from a list of prototype vehicles developed by Steelcraft during the latter half of the 20th century. The Philippine Army has expressed significant interest in the project, helping to bankroll a few aspects of the prototypes, indicating intent to purchase a number units once the MX-8 has exited the development stage.

Development
The first prototype of the MX-8 was manufactured by  Steelcraft in 2005 under the Philippine's Self Reliant Defense Posture Law. Steelcraft also manufactured the first Philippine-made armored personnel carrier, the Hari-Digma (Filipino, "King of Battle") and also its variant, the MX-1 Kalakian. The MX-8 is to fulfill a role that the larger Cadillac Gage Commandos and LAV-300s in service with the Armed Forces of the Philippines could not, and that was to provide small, armored and armed escorts through rebel-infested jungles. Though not  officially used by Steelcraft, or the Army, Barako ("Wild boar") is the nickname given to the vehicle by members of the Philippines Defense Forces' Forum. Designed to be low-cost, yet effectively durable for the price – protection is equivalent to that of a Simba – a single unit costs roughly Php 6.8 million, around US$150,000.

Currently, the MX-8 is in its second prototype form after the first went through testing at the Light Armored Division's Research and Development Command with significant changes done to the frame and power train after the RDC's testing and evaluation found several potential problems arising from the prototype's design. The second prototype gets rid of these problems, and is currently awaiting to be transferred to the RDC for further testing and evaluation.

Engine
Taking into consideration low cost, yet making the MX-8 as reliable as possible, the designers incorporated an off-the-shelf engine and drivetrain from a Mitsubishi medium-duty truck, a 4-cylinder, 4.3 liter, turbocharged, intercooler engine giving the MX-8 150 horsepower. Running on a 5-speed manual transmission, the MX-8 gets a 35.9:1 power-to-weight ratio that is transmitted to a live-axle, semi-elliptical rear and double wishbone, coil suspension up front for its four-wheel drive platform. The MX-8 gets 100–120 km/h on paved roads, presumably less on unpaved roads, though statistics are not quite clear on this issue.

Armor

The MX-8's monocoque hull is made from quarter-inch rolled steel plating and is resistant to 7.62 mm armor-piercing rounds from the front, rear and sides at point-blank range. Glancing shots from .50-caliber rounds will be deflected by the armor but will penetrate if shot head-on unto an armor panel. Building a monocoque body around the drive train and engine ensures maximum body rigidity and eases manufacturing constraints while allowing the incorporation of a semi-V shaped hull and blow-away wheel wells as measures against anti-vehicle mines and IEDs.

A 1-meter fully enclosed turret is situated on the top of the vehicle, allowing a variety of weapons configurations such as a 40 mm automatic grenade launcher or .50 cal heavy machine gun for fire-support roles. This enclosed turret may be replaced with an open turret ring mounting a simple heavy or general purpose machine gun and gunner shield.

Armament
Armament is limited by the vehicle's carrying capacity, similar to smaller armored vehicle standards, as well as what can dimensionally fit in the one-meter armored turret. The following may be the primary weapons outfitted on the MX-8:
 7.62 mm machine gun
 40 mm automatic grenade launcher
 M2 .50 heavy machine gun
 Remote controlled turret

The Philippine Army has been experimenting with a number of Humvees mounting an M134 Vulcan Minigun in place of the ring-mounted machine gun, and this kind of set-up has a good chance of being put in use on the MX-8.

Variants
Proposed variants rumored to be in the pipeline as soon as production officially starts, though nothing final has come from Steelcraft, include: Armored personnel carrier and Amphibious assault vehicle.

See also
 Cadillac Gage Commando
 Simba (APC)
 Mowag Piranha
 MX-1

References
 "Army developing prototype armored escort vehicle" thread at the www.timawa.net forum
 The Philippine Star newspaper article dated March 17, 2007 titled, "Army developing prototype armored escort vehicle" by James Mananghaya
 "On Scout Car/Escort Vehicle" page from the Philippine Army Light Armor Division website

Armoured cars
Wheeled infantry fighting vehicles
Armored fighting vehicles of the Philippines
Military vehicles introduced in the 2000s
Armoured fighting vehicles of the post–Cold War period